Claviger araxidis is a species of beetle, from the subfamily Pselaphinae, of the rove beetles. It belongs to the Clavifer subgenus of the Claviger genus. It was first described by Edmund Reitter in 1890. The species lives in Armenia.

References 

Staphylinidae
Beetles of Asia